The Golden Dream (literally: "The Cage of Gold") is a 2013 Mexican drama film directed by Spanish-born Mexican director Diego Quemada-Díez. It was screened in the Un Certain Regard section at the 2013 Cannes Film Festival where Quemada-Diez won the A Certain Talent award for his directing work and the ensemble cast. The film also won the Golden Ástor for Best Film at the 2013 Mar del Plata International Film Festival.

Plot
Like the 1987 film, and the song, the plot concerns immigration to the United States from Latin American countries.  However, unlike the earlier film that concerned itself with a successful and middle-aged Mexican immigrant, the plot of this film deals with younger undocumented immigrants.

Samuel, Sara and Juan, three teenagers from Guatemala, decide to leave poverty by going to the United States.  After crossing the Mexican border by boat, they find another immigrant, a Tzotzil native called Chauk who does not know Spanish but is able to befriend Sara.  When they arrive in the town of Chiapas, they busk for money to eat and drink but are later caught by Mexican Immigration Police agents, who steal Juan's boots and threaten Chauk with a gun, before deporting all of them back to Guatemala.

They are deposited by the border to Mexico and so they are able to easily find a way back across it, but at this point Samuel decides to stay in Guatemala.  Juan dislikes the idea of going with Chauk, but Sara forces him to go on with him and the three continue on the road to the north.  While riding on a train to northern Mexico, the train is stopped by the Mexican Army who attempt to capture the immigrants; however, the trio manage to escape and are offered refuge and work by a sugar-cane farmer.  During a party at the plantation, the three of them drink and dance until Sara and Juan begin kissing, and end up leaving Chauk alone.

The next morning Chauk feels betrayed by Sara, but decides to remain with them and continue the ride to the north.  During the trip, they are detained by drug traffickers, who steal the belongings of the passengers and kidnap the females.  Sara is soon recognized as a girl and is taken by the traffickers; when Juan and Chauk resist, Juan is seriously injured and Chauk is knocked unconscious.

Chauk wakes up and tends to Juan's injuries.  When Juan recovers, both recognize that they can do nothing for Sara and decide to continue their voyage to the north.  During the next train ride, they meet a teenager from Guatemala that offers them jobs, but in reality it is just a trick and the boy delivers them into the hands of a group of criminals.  When the leader learns that Juan is from his own hometown, Juan is released.  Juan later returns and offers the leader the American Dollars he had saved before the journey, in order to free Chauk.

Juan and Chauk arrive in Mexicali, where they get help from a group of immigrant traffickers to cross the border between Mexico and United States. The traffickers take the boys across the border, but leave the two on their own in the desert, where Chauk is killed by an immigrant hunter. Juan then arrives in Phoenix where he gets a job in a meat factory. The movie ends with Juan looking up at snow falling in the night sky, realizing that Chauk had wanted to come north to see snow for the first time.

Cast
 Brandon López as Juan
 Rodolfo Domínguez as Chauk
 Carlos Chajon as Samuel
 Karen Noemí Martínez Pineda as Sara

References

External links
 

2013 films
2013 drama films
Best Picture Ariel Award winners
Mexican drama films
2010s Spanish-language films
Tzotzil-language films
2010s Mexican films